Eleanor Cayaba Bulut-Begtang is a Filipina politician from the province of Apayao, Philippines. She is the former governor of Apayao in northern Philippines from 2019 to 2022. She was elected as a governor in 2019 after she completed her three allowable term as a congresswoman of Apayao from 2010 to 2019. She is currently the representative of Apayao, having been elected in 2022.

References

External links
Province of Apayao

|-

|-

Living people
People from Apayao
Governors of Apayao
Members of the House of Representatives of the Philippines from Apayao
PDP–Laban politicians
Nationalist People's Coalition politicians
Year of birth missing (living people)
21st-century Filipino politicians
21st-century Filipino women politicians